Keetmanshoop Airport  is an airport serving Keetmanshoop, a city in the ǁKaras Region of Namibia. It has customs and immigration services and is home to the Namibia Aviation Training Academy (NATA).

The Keetmanshoop VOR-DME (Ident: KTV) is located on the field.

See also
List of airports in Namibia
Transport in Namibia

References

External links
 
 SkyVector - Keetmanshoop
 OurAirports - Keetmanshoop
 OpenStreetMap - Keetmanshoop

Airports in Namibia
Buildings and structures in ǁKaras Region
Keetmanshoop